The 1964 Delaware gubernatorial election was held on November 3, 1964.

Incumbent Democratic Governor Elbert N. Carvel was term-limited, having served two non-consecutive terms. Carvel instead ran for the U.S. Senate.

Democratic nominee Charles L. Terry Jr. defeated Republican nominee David P. Buckson with 51.35% of the vote.

General election

Nominations
Nominations were made by party conventions.

Candidates
David P. Buckson, Republican, incumbent Attorney General of Delaware and former Governor
Charles L. Terry Jr., Democratic, Chief Justice of the Delaware Supreme Court

Results

References

Bibliography
 
 

1964
Delaware
Gubernatorial
November 1964 events in the United States